Anaru Rangi (born 19 October 1988) is a New Zealand-born rugby union footballer who currently plays as a hooker for the Melbourne Rebels in Super Rugby.

Super Rugby statistics

References

1988 births
Living people
Australian rugby union players
Rugby union hookers
Western Force players
Perth Spirit players
New Zealand emigrants to Australia
Melbourne Rebels players
Melbourne Rising players
New Zealand expatriate rugby union players
Urayasu D-Rocks players
Expatriate rugby union players in Japan
Rugby union players from the Wellington Region
Bay of Plenty rugby union players